Miss Universe Cambodia 2019 was the 1st edition of the Miss Universe Cambodia pageant which was held on March 31, 2019, at the Nagaworld - NABA Theatre in Phnom Penh. Miss Universe Cambodia 2018 Rern Sinat crowned Somnang Alyna as her successor at the end of the event.

Miss Universe Cambodia 2019 competition awarded three titles to Cambodian representatives to three major international pageants. Miss Universe Cambodia 2018 Rern Sinat crowned Somnang Alyna as Somnang will compete and represent Cambodia at the Miss Universe 2019 competition; Miss International Cambodia 2017 Nheat Sophea crowned Kachnak Thyda Bon as Kachnak will represent Cambodia at the Miss International 2019 competition while Miss Earth Cambodia 2018 Keo Senglyhour crowned Thoung Mala as Thuong will compete and represent Cambodia at the Miss Earth 2019 competition. The pageant also crowned two Cambodian representatives to minor international beauty pageants. Miss Asia Pacific Cambodian 2018 Annchhany Kha crowned Po Kimtheng Sothida as Kimtheng will compete and represent Cambodia at the Miss Asia Pacific International 2019 competition while Miss Tourism Cambodia 2017 Kem Sreyke crowned John Sotima as John will compete and represent Cambodia at Miss Tourism International 2019, respectively.

Results 
Color keys

Contestant

Crossovers and returnees 
Contestants who previously competed or will be competing at other beauty pageants:

National Pageants 

Miss Cambodia
2017: Thoung Mala(Top10)
Miss World Cambodia
2019:In Leakena (1st Runner-Up)
Miss Grand Cambodia
2017: John Sotima (2nd Runner up)
2017: Roeun Youry (Top 10)
2017: Po Kimtheng Sothida (Top 10)
World Miss University Cambodia
2017: Somnang Alyna (1st Runner-Up)

International Pageants 

Miss Universe
2019:Somnang Alyna (Unplaced)

Miss International
2019: Kachnak Thyda Bon (Unplaced)

Miss Earth
2019: Thoung Mala (Unplaced)

Miss Asia Pacific International
2019: Po Kimtheng Sothida (Unplaced)

World Miss University
2017: Somnang Alyna (Top 16)

Miss City Tourism world
2017: Po kimtheng Sothida (3rd Runner-Up)

Miss Tourism International
2019: John Sotima (4th Runner-Up)
Miss Tourism Metropolitan
2019: Po Kimtheng Sothida(Top 10)
Miss Asia Awards
2019: Kong Socheata (Unplaced)

Miss Cosmos World
2019: Suy Bonavin (Unplaced)

Miss Dream girl of the year International
2019: John Sotima (Winner)

References 

2019 beauty pageants
Cambodian awards
2019 in Cambodia